Andreas Katsantonis (born 16 February 2000) is a Cypriot professional footballer who plays as a forward for Greek Super League 2 club Panserraikos.

International career
Katsantonis was first called up to the Cyprus national football team in June 2021 for a friendly against Hungary, he remained on the bench on that occasion.

Club statistics

References

External links

Living people
2000 births
Cypriot footballers
Cyprus youth international footballers
Cyprus under-21 international footballers
Association football midfielders
AC Omonia players
APOEL FC players
Ayia Napa FC players
Dalkurd FF players
Superettan players
Cypriot First Division players
Cypriot expatriate footballers
Expatriate footballers in Sweden
Cypriot expatriate sportspeople in Sweden